Amy Atkins is an American journalist and university professor.

Career 

Amy Atkins, a former correspondent for ABC's Good Morning America, has anchored newscasts and programs on MSNBC, CNBC, CNN, Court TV, and the Oxygen Network and she has reported for Oprah and The Daily Show.   For five years, Ms. Atkins was a weekend anchor and reporter at WNYW, Fox channel 5 in New York, where she hosted “Fox Style News,” a syndicated feature that focused on fashion, trends and ideas.   Amy Atkins received two New York Emmy awards while at Channel 5, for feature reporting and Outstanding On-camera Achievement.  Ms. Atkins was the host of USA Broadcasting's “The Times,” on WAMI-TV.    As a print journalist, Amy Atkins has contributed to Marie Claire, Paper Magazine, and City Magazine.   Ms. Atkins joined New York University as an adjunct professor of journalism in 1995.

Amy Atkins has appeared in several films, portraying reporters, including  “It Could Happen to You”, “The Opposite of Sex”, and “City Hall.”

References 

CNN transcript

Marie Claire article

New York Times filmography

Awards

Emmy Award, On Camera Achievement, WNYW

Living people
New York University faculty
Year of birth missing (living people)
American television journalists
American women television journalists
21st-century American women